Nora Kershaw Chadwick CBE FSA FBA (28 January 1891 – 24 April 1972) was an English philologist who specialized in Anglo-Saxon, Celtic and Old Norse studies.

Early life and education
Nora Kershaw was born in Lancashire in 1891, the first daughter of James Kershaw and Emma Clara Booth, married in 1888. Her sister Mabel was born in 1895.

She received her undergraduate degree from Newnham College at the University of Cambridge (where she was later an Honorary Life Fellow) and lectured at St Andrews during World War I. She returned to Cambridge in 1919 to study Anglo-Saxon and Old Norse under Professor Hector Munro Chadwick. They were married in 1922. 

The Chadwicks turned their home into a literary salon, a tradition which Mrs. Chadwick maintained after the death of her husband in 1947.

Career
Most of her life was spent on research, in her later years primarily on the Celts. She was University Lecturer in the Early History and Culture of the British Isles at the University of Cambridge from 1950 to 1958. She received honorary degrees from the University of Wales, the National University of Ireland and the University of St Andrews, and was made Commander of the Order of the British Empire in 1961. In 1965 she delivered the British Academy's Sir John Rhŷs Memorial Lecture.

Chadwick took an interdisciplinary approach and wrote on many topics; she demonstrated influentially the study of multiple "early cultures of north-west Europe" and brought comparative evidence to bear on heroic literature. Nora Chadwick is best known for her work on the Celts, particularly on the earliest period.

Bequest
Nora Chadwick died in Cambridge; she left a sum to the University of Cambridge to endow a readership in Celtic Studies.

Publications

She published the first full English translation of Hervarar saga ok Heiðreks together with other sagas and ballads in Stories and Ballads of the Far Past (1921), as well as a translation of the poem Hlöðskviða found within Heidrik's saga.

 , e-text 

With her husband, she published the three volume work The Growth of Literature between 1932–40.
 
 
  
She also wrote The Beginnings of Russian History, an enquiry into sources (1946).

Chadwick collaborated with V. M. Zhirmunsky on a revision of the part of volume III that deals with epic poetry in Central Asian languages. The revised text was published separately in 1969 as Oral Epics of Central Asia.

In 1955 she published Poetry and Letters in early Christian Gaul.

Chadwick wrote about Celtic Britain and Breton history, and collaborated with Myles Dillon and Kenneth H. Jackson. 
 Early Scotland (1949); Introduction, pages xi–xxvi, by Nora Kershaw Chadwick
 Studies in Early British History (editor and co-author, 1954)
 Celtic Britain (ancient people and places) (1963)
 The Age of Saints in the Celtic Church (1964)
 The Colonization of Brittany from Celtic Britain (1965)
 The Druids (1966)
 The Celtic Realms (1967, with Myles Dillon)
 The Celts (1970, with an introductory chapter by Dr. J.X.W.P. Corcoran: 'The Origins of the Celts: The Archaeological Evidence') 1997 pbk edition

On Anglo-Saxon language and literature:
 The Study of Anglo-Saxon (1955, with her husband)
 "The Monsters and Beowulf" (1960), in which she suggests that the monsters in Beowulf are drawn entirely from Scandinavian tradition.

A list of the publications of Hector and Nora Chadwick was printed for her 80th birthday in 1971.

References

External links
 
 

British medievalists
Women medievalists
Alumni of Newnham College, Cambridge
Academics of the University of St Andrews
Academics of the University of Cambridge
Commanders of the Order of the British Empire
Fellows of the Society of Antiquaries of London
Fellows of the British Academy
1891 births
1972 deaths
English philologists
Anglo-Saxon studies scholars
Germanic studies scholars
Old Norse studies scholars
Celtic studies scholars
British women historians
British salon-holders